Fernando Dayan Jorge Enriquez (born 3 December 1998) is a Cuban sprint canoeist. He took up canoeing in late 2015 and won the 2016 Pan American Championships with Serguey Torres in the C-2 1000 m event . They finished  sixth at the 2016 Olympics. He also competed in the Tokyo 2020 Olympic Games and won a gold medal in the Men's C-2 1000 metres event.

In 2022, Jorge defected from Cuba while he was traveling in Mexico.

References

External links

1998 births
Living people
Canoeists at the 2016 Summer Olympics
Olympic canoeists of Cuba
Cuban male canoeists
ICF Canoe Sprint World Championships medalists in Canadian
People from Cienfuegos
Pan American Games medalists in canoeing
Pan American Games gold medalists for Cuba
Pan American Games silver medalists for Cuba
Canoeists at the 2019 Pan American Games
Medalists at the 2019 Pan American Games
Canoeists at the 2020 Summer Olympics
Medalists at the 2020 Summer Olympics
Olympic medalists in canoeing
Olympic gold medalists for Cuba
20th-century Cuban people
21st-century Cuban people